Tangdong Subdistrict is a subdistrict and the seat of Zixing City in Hunan, China. The subdistrict was formed  in 1989 and merged the former Chengshui Town to it in 2015.

See also 
 List of township-level divisions of Hunan

References

External links 

Zixing
Subdistricts of Hunan
Township-level divisions of Chenzhou
County seats in Hunan